South Londonderry can refer to:

In Northern Ireland
 South Londonderry (UK Parliament constituency), a former UK Parliament constituency
 South Londonderry (Northern Ireland Parliament constituency), a former Northern Ireland Parliament constituency
 The southern part of County Londonderry

In the United States
 South Londonderry Township, Pennsylvania
 South Londonderry, Vermont
 South Londonderry Village Historic District

See also 
 Londonderry (disambiguation) 
 Derry (disambiguation)